Adriano Mario Garsia (born 20 August 1928) is a Tunisian-born Italian American mathematician who works in analysis, combinatorics, representation theory, and algebraic geometry. He is a student of Charles Loewner and has published work on representation theory, symmetric functions, and algebraic combinatorics. He and Mark Haiman made the N!_conjecture. He is also the namesake of the Garsia–Wachs algorithm for optimal binary search trees, which he published with his student Michelle L. Wachs in 1977.

Born to Italian Tunisians in Tunis, Garsia moved to Rome in 1946.

, he had 36 students and at least 200 descendants, according to the data at the Mathematics Genealogy Project. He was on the faculty of the University of California, San Diego.    He retired in 2013 after 57 years at UCSD as a founding member of the Mathematics Department. At his 90 Birthday Conference in 2019, it was notable that he was the oldest principal investigator of a grant from the National Science Foundation in the country.

In 2012, he became a fellow of the American Mathematical Society.

Books by A. Garsia
 Adriano M. Garsia, Topics in Almost Everywhere Convergence, Lectures in Advanced Mathematics Volume 4, Markham Publishing Co., Chicago, Ill., 1970. 
 Adriano M. Garsia, Martingale inequalities: Seminar Notes on Recent Progress, Mathematics Lecture Notes Series, W. A. Benjamin, Inc., Reading, Mass.-London-Amsterdam, 1973. 
 Adriano M. Garsia and Mark Haiman, Orbit Harmonics and Graded Representations, Research Monograph, to appear as part of the collection published by the Laboratoire de Combinatoire et d'Informatique Mathématique, edited by S. Brlek, Université du Québec à Montréal.
 Adriano M. Garsia and Ömer Eğecioğlu, Lessons in Enumerative Combinatorics, Graduate Texts in Mathematics 290, Springer Nature, Switzerland AG, 2021. ISBN 978-3-030-71249-5.

References

External links 
 

1928 births
Living people
Italian emigrants to the United States
20th-century American mathematicians
21st-century American mathematicians
Stanford University alumni
University of California, San Diego faculty
Fellows of the American Mathematical Society
People from Tunis
Combinatorialists
Scientists from California
Italian expatriates in Tunisia